Erik Gunnar Asplund (22 September 1885 – 20 October 1940) was a Swedish architect, mostly known as a key representative of Nordic Classicism of the 1920s, and during the last decade of his life as a major proponent of the modernist style which made its breakthrough in Sweden at the Stockholm International Exhibition (1930). Asplund was professor of architecture at the Royal Institute of Technology from 1931. His appointment was marked by a lecture, later published under the title "Our architectonic concept of space." The Woodland Crematorium at Stockholm South Cemetery (1935-1940) is considered his finest work and one of the masterpieces of modern architecture.

Major works 
Among Asplund's most important works is the Stockholm Public Library, constructed between 1924 and 1928, which stands as the prototypical example of the Nordic Classicism and so-called Swedish Grace movement. It was particularly influential on the proposal submitted for the competition for the design of the Viipuri Library in 1927 by Finnish architect Alvar Aalto, who regarded Asplund as his mentor.

Another important work is the extension of the Gothenburg City Hall Extension building which Asplund started on 1913 and finished 1937 - it shows his transformation from neo-classical to functionalist architect, a transformation in parallel with other European modernists like Erich Mendelsohn.

Asplund collaborated with architect Sigurd Lewerentz in the design of Skogskyrkogården, a cemetery which is a UNESCO world heritage site, created between 1914 and 1940. They were also the main architects for the temporary Stockholm International Exhibition (1930). Although temporary, the modernist, exposed-glass-and-steel-frame Entry Pavilion at the fair was internationally influential. In fact, it was influential already before its completion, having an influence on the much smaller Turku Fair in Finland, designed by Alvar Aalto and Erik Bryggman, who had travelled to Stockholm to see its construction.

Gunnar Asplund is considered perhaps the most important modernist Swedish architect and has had a major influence on later generations of Swedish and Nordic architects.

Our architectonic concept of space 
The lecture "Our architectonic concept of space" was delivered in 1931 on the occasion of Asplund being appointed professor of architecture at the Royal Institute of Technology in Stockholm. Asplund published few theoretical texts. The lecture was later regarded as an important contribution to the attitudes of Asplund, as well as others of his generation, towards the architectural problems of the time. The lecture has its background in the then well known 2-volume book by German philosopher Oswald Spengler  "The decline of the West" (1918 and 1922).

Bibliography 
 López Peláez, José Manuel (2002). La arquitectura de Gunnar Asplund. Barcelona, Fundación Caja de Arquitectos. .

Gallery

Exhibitions 

The Architecture of Gunnar Asplund, MoMA, New York (1978)
En chantier: The Collections of the CCA, 1989-1999, Canadian Centre for Architecture, Montreal (1999-2000)
Architecture and Design Drawings: Inaugural Installation, MoMA, New York (2004-2005)
75 Years of Architecture at MoMA, MoMA, New York (2007-2008)
In Situ: Architecture and Landscape, MoMA, New York (2009-2010)

Notes

External links

Erik Gunnar Asplund Arkitekt. Online catalog of works and architecture map guide
 Website about Asplunds work on Stockholm Public Library
 Website with several photos about Asplunds work on Stockholm Public Library
 Further mentions/photos about his major masterpiece Stockholm Public Library
 
 
Finding aid for the Erik Gunnar Asplund collection, Canadian Centre for Architecture.
 

1885 births
1940 deaths
20th-century Swedish architects
Academic staff of the KTH Royal Institute of Technology
Burials at Skogskyrkogården
Artists from Stockholm